Chloroclystis sierraria is a moth in the family Geometridae. It was described by Charles Swinhoe in 1904. It is found in Sierra Leone, Yemen and Angola.

References

External links

Moths described in 1904
sierraria
Moths of Africa
Insects of Angola
Taxa named by Charles Swinhoe